Reto Rudolf Badrutt (10 July 1908 – April 1974) was a Swiss ski jumper. He competed in the individual event at the 1936 Winter Olympics.

References

1908 births
1974 deaths
Swiss male ski jumpers
Olympic ski jumpers of Switzerland
Ski jumpers at the 1936 Winter Olympics
Place of birth missing